Launch is a name given to several different types of boat. The wide range of usage of the name extends from utilitarian craft through to pleasure boats built to a very high standard.

In naval use, the launch was introduced as a ship's boat towards the end of the 17th century. On each warship, the launch was usually the largest boat out of those carried aboard. It could be propelled by oar or sail, with this type remaining in service into the 20th century. Steam launches were introduced on a trial basis in 1867, but as steam-powered ship's boats became more common, the majority were steam pinnaces. 

Other military examples were the various motor launches used in the 20th century, employed for harbour defence, anti-submarine patrols, escorting coastal convoys, minesweeping and recovering aircrew from crashed aircraft. Generally, these were decked boats, some of which were capable of fast speeds.

A powered boat operated by a regulatory or official organisation may be termed a launchsuch as the police launch or a harbour-master's launch. The size range and capabilities vary according to the precise role.

In private use, a launch is invariably a powered boat, using a steam, electric, petrol or diesel engine. Some are built to a very high standard of finish, with large amounts of varnished hardwood and polished fittings. Various local historic types are kept in use by enthusiasts and museums.

Etymology
The word launch is derived from the Spanish lancha, which may be translated into English as "pinnace". It has been suggested that lancha is in turn derived from a Malay word. The first instance of "launch" being used as a boat type in English was in 1697.

History

The launch steadily replaced the long-boat in the Royal Navy over the latter half of the 18th century. Both were usually the biggest boat carried by a warship or a merchant vessel in the age of sail. The transition from longboat to launch was influenced by the East India Company successfully experimenting with this change.
 
Launches were preferred as having greater carrying capacity, though they could be considered less seaworthy. An important role was the carrying of drinking water. For example, a 33 foot launch of 1804 could carry 14 large "leaguers" (barrels containing  each), making a load of just over nine and half tonnes of water. A warship's launch would also be fitted with a windlass that allowed a ship's anchor to be carried or to be weighed (raised). A ship's boat would often be used to kedge a ship out of a harbour or away from a hazard such as a lee shore before steam tugs were available to move sailing vessels.

The launches issued to naval ships varied in size depending on the size of the ship they equipped. An 1815 schedule of ship's boats showed the  range of 15 different lengths for launches from 34 feet (for a ship of 100 guns) down to 16 feet for a 200 ton sloop. As steam power became common in the navy, the need to transport drinking water (which could be distilled in the engine room) and transport anchors and cables to move a sailing ship both disappeared. By the last quarter of the 19th century, launches were only issued in one length, 42 feet.

Launches had double-banked oars The usual sailing rig for much of the 19th century was a two-masted ketch rig. A schooner rig was in use from 1878 and the de Horsey sloop rig was adopted from 1884.

During the Demak Sultanate attack on Portuguese Malacca of 1513, lancaran were used as armed troop transports for landing alongside penjajap and kelulus, as the Javanese junks were too large to approach shore.

In 1788 Captain William Bligh and 18 crewmen were set adrift by mutineers in Bounty’s 23-foot launch. Bligh navigated the open boat more than 4000 miles, losing only one manTonga to Timor, .

Civilian use in the UK
On the River Thames the term "launch" is used to mean any motorised pleasure boat. The usage arises from the legislation governing the management of the Thames and laying down the categories of boats and the tolls for which they were liable.

Military use in the UK

Motor Launch was the designation for a type of vessel used in World War II by the Royal Navy and some other navies for inshore work defending the coast from submarines.

Sports 
In competitive rowing the term "launch" is used to refer to any motorized boat used by the coach to follow practicing boats during workouts.

See also 
RAF rescue launch
Cabin cruiser

 Picket boat, a naval launch

Notes

References 

Boat types
Ship's boats
Motorboats